This article lists players who have captained the Antrim county hurling team in the Leinster Senior Hurling Championship, the Ulster Senior Hurling Championship and the All-Ireland Senior Hurling Championship.

List of captains

+Captains
Hurling team captains
Antrim